Rinard Mills is a small unincorporated community on the Little Muskingum River in southwestern Washington Township, Monroe County, Ohio, United States. It is named after Isaac Rinard, who owned a mill at the village. The village is situated on State Route 26 between Marietta (county seat of Washington County) and Woodsfield (county seat of Monroe County). The village has a cemetery. Several years ago, a resident of the community found the remains of a mill stone in the Little Muskingum.  It was incorporated into Isaac Rinard's grave marker and was cause for a special event.

References

Unincorporated communities in Monroe County, Ohio
Unincorporated communities in Ohio